The 2017 U.S. Cellular 250 was the 19th stock car race of the 2017 NASCAR Xfinity Series season and the ninth iteration of the event. The race was held on Saturday, July 29, 2017, in Newton, Iowa, at Iowa Speedway, a 0.875 miles (1.408 km) permanent D-shaped low-banked racetrack. The race was extended from 150 laps to 154 laps, due to a NASCAR overtime finish. Ryan Preece, driving for Joe Gibbs Racing, held off Kyle Benjamin in a close finish for his first career NASCAR Xfinity Series win. Preece would beat Benjamin by 0.054 of a second. To fill out the podium, Brian Scott of Richard Childress Racing would finish third, respectively.

Background 

It has over 25,000 permanent seats as well as a unique multi-tiered RV viewing area along the backstretch.

Entry list 

 (R) denotes rookie driver.
 (i) denotes driver who is ineligible for series driver points.

Practice

First practice 
The first practice session was held on Friday, July 28, at 4:00 PM CST. The session would last for 55 minutes.

Final practice 
The final practice session was held on Friday, July 28, at 5:30 PM CST. The session would last for 55 minutes.

Qualifying 
Qualifying was held on Saturday, July 29, at 11:00 AM CST. Since Iowa Speedway is under  in length, the qualifying system was a multi-car system that included three rounds. The first round was 15 minutes, where every driver would be able to set a lap within the 15 minutes. Then, the second round would consist of the fastest 24 cars in Round 1, and drivers would have 10 minutes to set a lap. Round 3 consisted of the fastest 12 drivers from Round 2, and the drivers would have 5 minutes to set a time. Whoever was fastest in Round 3 would win the pole.

Bobby Dale Earnhardt would fail to qualify.

Full qualifying results

Race results 
Stage 1 Laps: 60

Stage 2 Laps: 60

Stage 3 Laps: 134

Standings after the race 

Drivers' Championship standings

Note: Only the first 12 positions are included for the driver standings.

References 

2017 NASCAR Xfinity Series
NASCAR races at Iowa Speedway
July 2017 sports events in the United States
2017 in sports in Iowa